"Freakshow" is a single by the British band The Cure which was released on 13 June 2008 on Geffen Records in the United Kingdom. In the United States, the single was released three days early, on 10 June because of the tradition of releasing songs on a Tuesday. The song debuted in Mexico City on 22 October 2007 under the title "Don't Say Anything".

Track listing
"Freakshow (Mix 13)" – 2:32
"All Kinds of Stuff" – 3:13

Written by Cooper/Gallup/Smith/Thompson

Charts

References

2008 singles
2008 songs
The Cure songs
Geffen Records singles
Number-one singles in Spain
Songs written by Jason Cooper
Songs written by Porl Thompson
Songs written by Robert Smith (musician)
Songs written by Simon Gallup